Svend Hansen (5 July 1906 – 25 July 1958) was a Danish footballer. He played in three matches for the Denmark national football team in 1928.

References

External links
 

1906 births
1958 deaths
Danish men's footballers
Denmark international footballers
Place of birth missing
Association footballers not categorized by position